Jiang Limin (born 29 February 1988) is a Chinese female shot putter who won two individual gold medal at the Youth World Championships.

References

External links

1988 births
Living people
Chinese female shot putters
Sportspeople from Nantong
People from Rudong County
21st-century Chinese women